A total solar eclipse will occur on October 16, 2126. A solar eclipse occurs when the Moon passes between Earth and the Sun, thereby totally or partly obscuring the image of the Sun for a viewer on Earth. A total solar eclipse occurs when the Moon's apparent diameter is larger than the Sun's, blocking all direct sunlight, turning day into darkness. Totality occurs in a narrow path across Earth's surface, with the partial solar eclipse visible over a surrounding region thousands of kilometres wide.

Visibility 
The eclipse will cross Europe and Central Asia and will be visible in Norway, Sweden, Finland, Estonia, European part of Russia, Kazakhstan, Uzbekistan, Kyrgyzstan, Tajikistan and China.

For Moscow it will be the next total eclipse after the 1887 eclipse (which was in the northern part of city). Other large cities in the total phase of eclipse include Umeå, Tampere, Helsinki, Narva, Saint Petersburg, Tver, Ryazan, Saratov, Atyrau, Tashkent and Kashgar.

Saros 155

References 

 NASA Solar eclipses: 2101 to 2200
 NASA graphics
 NASA googlemap of eclipse path

2126 10 16
2126 10 16
2126 10 16
2120s